Northcote High School is a co-educational, state secondary school in Northcote, Victoria, Australia. It is situated at the southern end of the City of Darebin, on St Georges Road, Northcote.

The school teaches from Years 7 to 12 and has a current population of 1,849 students. Northcote High has a large music and science program, and has been recognised as a significant leader in the use of learning technologies in the classroom.

History 
Northcote High School was established in 1926 as a co-educational secondary school, one of the first six to be established in Melbourne by the Victorian Government. The school owes its establishment largely to agitation led by John Cain (senior), Northcote City Councillor and later Member of the Victorian Legislative Assembly for Jika Jika, with support from the headmasters of nearby Northcote (Helen Street) Primary School and Wales Street Primary School. Cain's repeated efforts to establish a school to provide secondary education for the then predominantly working class suburb of Northcote were finally successful, despite an environment of opposition from conservative politicians and independent principals.

Although Northcote High School was established as a co-educational school, it became a boys' school after 1928 when Preston Girls High School was established. Martin Hansen, the then Chief Inspector of Secondary Education, was convinced high schools should be segregated by gender after a tour of schools in the US and UK. In the 1980s Northcote High School again began to enrol girls in response to community pressure, officially moving to co-education in 1989. In 2018 there were approximately 920 boys and 829 girls enrolled.

Northcote High School first offered a limited Maths and Science Matriculation (final year certificate) in 1946. Principal Alex Sutherland expanded Matriculation in the 1950s to include most subjects on the curriculum. The school continues this tradition today with a very broad range of Victorian Certificate of Education (VCE) subjects on offer, including a relatively wide range of humanities subjects.

Northcote High School celebrated its 90th anniversary in 2016.

Principals 
The following individuals have served as principal of Northcote High School:

International links 
Northcote High School has a long tradition of developing ties with schools overseas. In the 1930s students at Northcote High School corresponded with a school in Poland, and in the early 1950s the school began the practice of enrolling and hosting students from overseas, partly under the auspices of the Colombo plan. In 1999, a sister school agreement was made with Huaibei Number One High School in Anhui province, China and a second with Tienjin - Binhai Foreign Languages School in 2016. Regular exchanges are conducted with these schools. There is also a reciprocal exchange agreement with a school in France.

In 2015 Northcote High School had one of the state's largest International student programs (ISP) with more than 80 students from all five continents studying in the post-compulsory Years 10 - 12. In 2017, the school became the first government school to deliver the VCE offshore, in partnership with Chinese schools. In 2018, the school was awarded the Department of Education's first award for Excellence in Global Learning.

Notable alumni 
John Cain, former Labor MLA, Victorian State Premier
 James Ford Cairns, former Labor MHR, Federal Minister and Deputy Prime Minister
Don Chipp , former Liberal MHR, Federal Minister, and Founder Australian Democrats
Kristen Condon, actress
Professor Bruce Dawe, poet and writer. Winner of the Patrick White Literary Award
Wayne Duncan, bass player in Australian 1970s rock band Daddy Cool
Ken Emselle, Australian rules footballer for 
Noel Ferrier, entertainer
Jaimee Fourlis, tennis player
Don Furness, Australian rules footballer for 
John Gill, former Australian rules footballer for 
John Greening, former Australian rules footballer for 
Jack Hamilton , VFL Commissioner and former Collingwood footballer
Vernon Hauser, former Liberal MLC
Ashley Henderson, bass player in Australian funk band Stylus
Professor Ken Inglis, historian
Trevor Kaine, former Liberal ACT Chief Minister
Geoff Leek, former Australian rules footballer for 
Colin Lovitt , barrister
James Mollison , Director National Gallery of Australia, Director National Gallery of Victoria
Jac Nasser , Chairman of BHP Billiton, former CEO Ford Motor Company
Normie Rowe, entertainer
John Tasioulas, Yeoh Professor of Politics, Philosophy and Law at King's College London
Professor Dick Telford, Australia Sports Medicine
Ron Todd, former Australian rules footballer for 
Graeme Weideman, former Liberal MLA, State Minister
Garry Wilson, former Australian rules footballer for 
Ned Long- AFL Footballer

See also 
 List of schools in Victoria
 Victorian Certificate of Education

References

Further reading

External links 

Northcote High School

Public high schools in Victoria (Australia)
Educational institutions established in 1926
Rock Eisteddfod Challenge participants
1926 establishments in Australia
Buildings and structures in the City of Darebin